Peter Fleming and Guy Forget were the defending champions but only Forget competed that year with Yannick Noah.

Forget and Noah won in the final 6–4, 7–6 against Boris Becker and Eric Jelen.

Seeds
The top four seeded teams received byes into the second round.

Draw

Finals

Top half

Bottom half

References
 1987 Pilot Pen Classic Doubles Draw

Pilot Pen Classic Doubles